Jacob Isett House and Store, also known as Arch Spring Farm, is a historic home and store building located at Arch Spring, Blair County, Pennsylvania.  The property includes the Jacob Isett House (1805), store (1799), and summer kitchen; five wood frame outbuildings (c. 1870); and various archaeological remains.  The house is a -story, seven bay, limestone dwelling in a vernacular Georgian style.  Connected to the house is the one-story summer kitchen.  The store is a two-story limestone building.  The wood frame outbuildings are a wood shed, weigh shed, stable, barn, and implement shed.  The archaeological site includes the remains of an integrated mill village.

It was added to the National Register of Historic Places in 1997.

References

Houses on the National Register of Historic Places in Pennsylvania
Archaeological sites on the National Register of Historic Places in Pennsylvania
Georgian architecture in Pennsylvania
Houses completed in 1799
Houses in Blair County, Pennsylvania
National Register of Historic Places in Blair County, Pennsylvania